Tres cosas (Spanish for "three things") is the third studio album by Argentine musician Juana Molina.

Critical reception

 The New York Times listed it sixth best pop album of 2004.

Track listing

Personnel

 Juana Molina – audio production, composer, main personnel, primary artist, vocals
 Alejandro Franov – keyboards, main personnel, vocals (background)
 Petra Haden – violin
 Martin Iannaccone – viola
 Fernando Kabusacki – guitar
 Francisca Mayol – xylophone

References

2002 albums
Albums recorded in a home studio
Domino Recording Company albums
Juana Molina albums
Spanish-language albums